The Coliseu dos Recreios (also known as Coliseu de Lisboa) is a multi-purpose auditorium located in Lisbon, Portugal.

History

The main building was constructed within a metal lattice by Francisco Goulard between 1888 and 1890. While the facade was completed by Cesare Ianz. The building was inaugurated on 14 August 1890. In 1897 the Geographical Society of Lisbon occupied part of the spaces, inaugurating the Portuguese Hall, authored by architect José Luís Monteiro (1849-1942) shortly after. António Santos Júnior became director general of the Coliseu dos Recreios in the same year.

On the death of António Santos (1920), the direction of the Coliseu was assumed by Ricardo Covões.

A major refurbishment of the installations was completed in February 1994, that included remodelling of the hall and stage, and reconstruction of the surrounding spaces.

On 22 August 2006, the Coliseu (owing to its stylistic, typological and historic importance) was designated for preservation. The DRCLisboa, on establishing the Special Protection Zone for the Castle of São Jorge (and surroundings), included the building. As a Property of Public Interest, the National Council for Culture proposed that archiving of the Special Protection Zone on 10 October 2011, which were necessitated on 18 October 2011 by IGESPAR.

Architecture

The Coliseu is actually two juxtapositioned buildings. This includes a rectangular three-story building, whose principal facade is oriented to the southwest. The first floor includes the Coliseu dos Recreios' atrium (94-98), the vestibule and bar-restaurant of the Sociedade de Geografia; the second floor, which as functions as library of the organization; and third floor, the Sala Portugal. The rectangular area is internally divided into three areas supported by steel pillars/columns, and interlinked by steel staircase, allowing circulation vertically. The twelve-sided events hall is encircled by seating and two floors of boxseating. To the northeast and southwest, respectively, are special boxseats, framed by three arches, over one of the three accesses. The hall is covered by metal ceiling, supported by steel tubing.

The events hall has a capacity of between 2846 (seated) to 4000 people, depending on its configuration.

Beside concerts, other shows are hosted there, including theatre, circus, dance shows and awards ceremonies. Performers have included Cirque du Soleil, Tango Fire, and several ballets.

Noted performers

Agir
Alter Bridge
Amália Rodrigues
Amor Electro
Ana Moura
Anastacia
Anselmo Ralph
Aurea
Biffy Clyro
Buika
Bush
Caetano Veloso
Camané
Carlos do Carmo
Carminho
Carolina Deslandes
Celeste Rodrigues
Cesária Évora
Cuca Roseta
D.A.M.A
Da Weasel
Dead Combo
Deep Purple
Deolinda
Diana Krall
Dino d'Santiago
Diogo Piçarra
Duran Duran
Extreme
Fafá de Belém
Gabriela Rocha
Gavin James
Gilberto Gil
Gregory Porter
Gusttavo Lima
Harlem Gospel Choir
Imagine Dragons
Jamie Cullum
João Gilberto
João Pedro Pais
Jorge Palma
José Cid
Kevinho
LCD Soundsystem
Léo Magalhães
Madonna
Mallu Magalhães
Marco Paulo
Maria Bethânia
Maria Lisboa
Marisa Monte
Mariza
Martinho da Vila
Massive Attack
Matias Damásio
Michel Teló
Miguel Araújo
Mika
Miles Davis
Mishlawi
Moonspell
My Chemical Romance
Niall Horan
Nightwish
Norah Jones
Os Azeitonas
Pablo Alborán
Papa Roach
Paula Fernandes
Pentatonix
Placebo
Plutónio
Prince
Radiohead
Raquel Tavares
Richie Campbell
Rise Against
R5
Salvador Sobral
Sam the Kid
Scott Bradlee's Postmodern Jukebox
Silence 4
Simple Minds
Simple Plan
Sum 41
The Flying Aces
The Gift
The National
Tiago Bettencourt
Vanessa da Mata
Woody Allen
Xutos & Pontapés
Yes

See also
List of theatres and auditoriums in Lisbon

References
Notes

Sources

External links 

 Official website of Coliseu dos Recreios

Culture in Lisbon
Theatres in Lisbon
Concert halls in Portugal
Music venues completed in 1890
Music venues in Portugal
1890 establishments in Portugal